Karl-Marx-Straße is a Berlin U-Bahn station located on the  line.
The station was opened in 1926 as "Bergstraße," and renamed in 1946. Although Karl Marx was a hero of the socialist republic of East Germany, the station is in former West Berlin. In 1968, the station was lengthened to 105m; due to this much of its original appearance was lost. In 1993, parts of the platform fell into the rail track and the station closed for a few days while repairs were made. The station is one stop from Neukölln station, where passengers can transfer to the S-Bahn.

References 

U7 (Berlin U-Bahn) stations
Railway stations in Germany opened in 1926
Buildings and structures in Neukölln